The general speed limits in Tunisia are:

50 km/h (31 mph) within urban areas.
70 km/h (43 mph) on four-lane expressways within urban areas.
90 km/h (56 mph) outside urban areas.
110 km/h (68 mph) on freeways.

References

Tunisia
Road transport in Tunisia